Agios Gordios is a local community and a holiday resort village on the west coast of the Greek island of Corfu.  The beach is located just 5 km from Sinarades. It is part of the municipality Achilleio. The town is home to several small hotels including the popular party hostel, The Pink Palace, which was visited numerous times by Queen Frontman Freddie Mercury before his passing in 1991. There are about 23 other hotels located in the area.

External links
 Agios Gordis Beach GTP Travel Pages

Beaches of Greece
Populated places in Corfu (regional unit)